Yaopu may refer to these towns in China:

Yaopu, Anhui (腰铺), in Chuzhou, Anhui
Yaopu, Guizhou (幺铺), in Anshun, Guizhou